Stanley William Risdon (13 August 1913 – 2 August 1979) was an English professional footballer who played in a variety of positions in the Football League for Exeter City and Brighton & Hove Albion.

Life and career
Risdon was born in 1913 in Exeter, Devon. He played minor football for Tipton St John and St Mary Majors before joining Exeter City, initially as an amateur, in 1933. Playing at inside right and then at right half, Risdon made 35 appearances in the Third Division South by the end of the 1935–36 season, but refused the offer of another season, and signed for division rivals Brighton & Hove Albion.

Never a regular in Albion's league side, Risdon made only 23 first-team appearances, mainly playing as a defender, before the Second World War put a stop to competitive football. He was able to play regularly for the club throughout the war, and made his final appearances for the first team in the 1946–47 season. As a benefit, the proceeds of three league matches in 1948 and 1949 were shared between Risdon and four other long-serving players, Len Darling, Ernie Marriott, Bert Stephens and Joe Wilson. 

Risdon joined the newly formed Southern League club Hastings United in 1948. He remained with Hastings United for six years, and received a benefit from them as well, before becoming player-coach of Sussex County League club Bexhill Town Athletic.

He died in Hove, Sussex, in 1979 at the age of 65.

Career statistics

References

1913 births
1979 deaths
Sportspeople from Exeter
Footballers from Devon
English footballers
Association football utility players
Exeter City F.C. players
Brighton & Hove Albion F.C. players
Hastings United F.C. (1948) players
English Football League players
Southern Football League players